Tom Newton (born March 8, 1954) is a former professional American football player who played running back for six seasons on the New York Jets and two seasons on the Oakland Raiders. He finished his career with a total of 772 yards and 9 touchdowns.

Tom was born in Carmel, Florida and has one child, a daughter named Khalishia Newton.

References

1954 births
American football running backs
New York Jets players
California Golden Bears football players
Living people